Flora Zeta Elizabeth Cheong-Leen (born November 20, 1959) is a Hong Kong actress and fashion designer.

Biography 
Cheong-Leen is an Australian who was born in Hong Kong. Her father Hilton Cheong-Leen was born in Georgetown, British Guyana and is of Chinese descent and her mother Pauline Chow is from Beijing. 

In her youth, Cheong-Leen studied in the U.K. and France. After returning to Hong Kong, Cheong-Leen was selected as leading actress in 10 full-length motion pictures including Life after Life (Cinema City), Duel to the Death (Golden Harvest), Chasing Girl (Cinema City), Return of the Deadly Blade (Champion International Film), Lung Gem Wei (Golden Harvest), and Cactus''. After a brief career as a film actress, she went on to create fashion designs and costumes.
 
Cheong-Leen launched her first clothing line, Pavlova, in 1981. Pavlova was followed by the Tian Art label, and Cheong-Leen couture collection.

Personal life
Cheong-Leen has been married and divorced four times. She has a daughter, Claudine, with her second husband, Michael Ying.

References 
 
 
 http://www.palazzolasvegas.com/assets/pdf/PALPR081209.pdf

1959 births
Living people
Australian chief executives
Australian educators
Australian fashion designers
Australian women fashion designers
Australian women in business
Australian people of Chinese descent
Australian people of Guyanese descent
Hong Kong educators
Hong Kong emigrants to Australia
Hong Kong businesspeople
Hong Kong fashion designers
Hong Kong women fashion designers
Hong Kong fashion businesspeople
Hong Kong film actresses
Hong Kong women in business
Hong Kong people of Guyanese descent
Naturalised citizens of Australia